Visa requirements for Icelandic citizens are administrative entry restrictions imposed on citizens of Iceland by the authorities of other states.

As a member state of the European Free Trade Association (EFTA), Icelandic citizens enjoy freedom of movement to live and work in other EFTA countries in accordance with the EFTA convention. Moreover, by virtue of Iceland's membership of the European Economic Area (EEA), Icelandic citizens also enjoy freedom of movement within all EEA member states. The Citizens’ Rights Directive defines the right of free movement for citizens of the EEA, and all EFTA and EU citizens are not only visa-exempt but are legally entitled to enter and reside in each other's countries.

In order to travel to another country, an Icelandic citizen requires a passport, except within the Nordic Passport Union, where no identity card is formally required. However, an identity card such as a driving licence is useful.

As of 11 January 2022, Icelandic citizens had visa-free or visa on arrival access to 180 countries and territories, ranking the Icelandic passport 11th in terms of travel freedom according to the Henley Passport Index.

Visa requirements map

Visa requirements

Territories and disputed areas
Visa requirements for Icelandic citizens for visits to various territories, disputed areas and restricted zones:

Europe
 — Visa required.
 — Visa required (issued for single entry for 21 days/1/2/3 months or multiple entry visa for 1/2/3 months).Travellers with Artsakh visa (expired or valid) or evidence of travel to Artsakh (stamps) will be permanently denied entry to Azerbaijan.
 Mount Athos — Special permit required (4 days: 25 euro for Orthodox visitors, 35 euro for non-Orthodox visitors, 18 euro for students). There is a visitors' quota: maximum 100 Orthodox and 10 non-Orthodox per day and women are not allowed.
 Brest and Grodno — Visa not required for 10 days.
 Crimea — Visa issued by Russia is required.
 — Visa free access for 3 months. Passport required.
 UN Buffer Zone in Cyprus — Access Permit is required for travelling inside the zone, except Civil Use Areas.
 — Visa not required.
 Jan Mayen — permit issued by the local police required for staying for less than 24 hours and permit issued by the Norwegian police for staying for more than 24 hours.
 — visa free for 90 days.
 — Visa free. Multiple entry visa to Russia and three-day prior notification are required to enter South Ossetia.
 — Visa free. Registration required after 24h.

Africa
 — special permit required.
  (outside Asmara) — visa covers Asmara only; to travel in the rest of the country, a Travel Permit for Foreigners is required (20 Eritrean nakfa).

 — eVisa for 3 months within any year period.
 — Visitor's Pass granted on arrival valid for 4/10/21/60/90 days for 12/14/16/20/25 pound sterling.
 — Permission to land required for 15/30 pounds sterling (yacht/ship passenger) for Tristan da Cunha Island or 20 pounds sterling for Gough Island, Inaccessible Island or Nightingale Islands.
 (Western Sahara controlled territory) — undefined visa regime.
 — visa required (30 days for 30 US dollars, payable on arrival).

Asia
 — Visa not required for 90 days.
 — Protected Area Permit (PAP) required for all of Arunachal Pradesh, Manipur, Mizoram and parts of Himachal Pradesh, Jammu and Kashmir and Uttarakhand. Restricted Area Permit (RAP) required for all of Andaman and Nicobar Islands and Lakshadweep and parts of Sikkim. Some of these requirements are occasionally lifted for a year.
 — Visa not required for 90 days.
 outside Pyongyang – People are not allowed to leave the capital city, tourists can only leave the capital with a governmental tourist guide (no independent moving)
 — Visa not required. Arrival by sea to Gaza Strip not allowed.
 — Visa not required for 90 days.
 Gorno-Badakhshan Autonomous Province — OIVR permit required (15+5 Tajikistani Somoni) and another special permit (free of charge) is required for Lake Sarez.
 Tibet Autonomous Region — Tibet Travel Permit required (10 US Dollars).
 Korean Demilitarized Zone — restricted zone.
 UNDOF Zone and Ghajar — restricted zones.

Caribbean and North Atlantic
 — Visa not required for 3 months.
 — Visa not required for 30 days.
 — Visa not required.
 Bonaire, St. Eustatius and Saba — Visa not required for 3 months.
 — Visa not required.
 — Visa not required for 6 months.
 — Visa not required for 3 months.
 — Visa not required for 6 months.
 — Visa not required under the Visa Waiver Program, for 90 days on arrival from overseas for 2 years. ESTA required.
 — Visa not required for 3 months.
 — Visa not required for 90 days.
 — Visa not required under the Visa Waiver Program, for 90 days on arrival from overseas for 2 years. ESTA required.

Oceania
 — Electronic authorization for 30 days.
 Ashmore and Cartier Islands — special authorisation required.
 Clipperton Island — special permit required.
 — Visa free access for 31 days.
 — Visa not required under the Visa Waiver Program, for 90 days on arrival from overseas for 2 years. ESTA required.
 — Visa on arrival valid for 30 days is issued free of charge.
 — 14 days visa free and landing fee US$35 or tax of US$5 if not going ashore.
 — Entry permit required.
 United States Minor Outlying Islands — special permits required for Baker Island, Howland Island, Jarvis Island, Johnston Atoll, Kingman Reef, Midway Atoll, Palmyra Atoll and Wake Island.

South America
 Galápagos — Online pre-registration is required. Transit Control Card must also be obtained at the airport prior to departure.

South Atlantic and Antarctica
 — Visitor Permit valid for 4 weeks is issued on arrival.
 — Pre-arrival permit from the Commissioner required (72 hours/1 month for 110/160 pounds sterling).
 — Certain countries will deny access to holders of Israeli visas or passport stamps of Israel, because of the Arab League boycott of Israel.

Vaccination
Many African countries, including Angola, Benin, Burkina Faso, Cameroon, Central African Republic, Chad, Democratic Republic of the Congo, Republic of the Congo, Côte d'Ivoire, Equatorial Guinea, Gabon, Ghana, Guinea, Liberia, Mali, Mauritania, Niger, Rwanda, São Tomé and Príncipe, Senegal, Sierra Leone, Uganda, Zambia require all incoming passengers to have a current International Certificate of Vaccination. Some other countries require vaccination only if the passenger is coming from an infected area.

Passport validity
Many countries require passport validity of no less than 6 months and one or two blank pages.

Consular protection of Icelandic citizens abroad

When in a country with no Icelandic representation, Icelandic citizens may seek assistance from public officials in the foreign services of any of the Nordic countries. This is afforded by the Helsinki Treaty which states that public officials in the foreign services of any of the Nordic countries shall assist citizens of another Nordic country if that country is not represented in the territory concerned.

See also

Icelandic passport
Visa requirements for EFTA nationals
Visa policy of the Schengen Area

References and Notes
References

Notes

External links
 Council regulation No 539/2001 of 15 March 2001 listing the third countries whose nationals must be in possession of visas when crossing the external borders and those whose nationals are exempt from that requirement
 Council regulation No 1932/2006 of 21 December 2006 amending Regulation (EC) No 539/2001 listing the third countries whose nationals must be in possession of visas when crossing the external borders and those whose nationals are exempt from that requirement

Visa requirements by nationality
Foreign relations of Iceland